Daniel Iffla (1825–1907), known as Osiris, was a financier and philanthropist.

Biography 

It invested in the Spanish railways, which earned him the Order of Isabella.

He devoted himself to philanthropy after the death of his wife Leonie Carlier, a year after she gave birth to two children.

His obsession with philanthropy emerged from the Jewish tradition of the tzedakah (charity), republican values and the irrepressible desire to spread his wealth. He built a statue in honor of Joan of Arc in Nancy, and an impressive collection of Napoleonic relics, bequeathed to the Pasteur Institute.

Disapproving of the conduct of his nieces, one of which was the mistress of Claude Debussy, he bequeathed his fortune to the Pasteur Institute (which used it in part for the creation of the Radium Institute) as well as assorted other charitable institutions.

Iffla built several synagogues in Paris, including the Buffault Synagogue, at Arcachon, one in Tours, and also the Vincennes Synagogue, as well as synagogues in Tunis and Lausanne. In the latter city, he also constructed a statue of William Tell (in gratitude to the Swiss for their reception of the army of Bourbaki in 1871). 
  
His grave in Paris is made of white marble surmounted by a large bronze reproduction of Michelangelo's statue Moses, from the church San Pietro in Vincoli, Rome.

References

Notes

Bibliography 
 Dominique Jarrassé,Osiris, patron Jewish nationalist French. Daniel Iffla (1825-1907).Editions of Aesthetic Miscellaneous, 2009.

External links
 
 the origins of Social Security on the site of the National Museum of Health Insurance
 Radium Institute, a pioneer in the fight against cancer
 https://www.pasteur.fr/en/research-journal/news/daniel-iffla-osiris-great-19th-century-philanthropist-and-institut-pasteur-s-most-generous-donor

French philanthropists
19th-century French Sephardi Jews
French financiers
French people of Moroccan-Jewish descent
Jewish philanthropists
1825 births
1907 deaths
Businesspeople from Bordeaux
Burials at Montmartre Cemetery
19th-century philanthropists
French people of Portuguese-Jewish descent